is a cover album by Japanese singer Keiko Masuda. It includes two new songs: "Ai Shōka" and "Itoshi Terutte Itte", as well as a new recording of Masuda's 1981 hit song "Suzume".

Track listing 
All songs arranged by Akira Masubachi.

References

External links
 

2014 albums
Keiko Masuda albums
Covers albums
Japanese-language albums
Warner Music Japan albums